Scandinavian Academy of Aeronautics was a Swedish  accredited college specializing in aerospace engineering and avionics, situated in Gothenburg from 1973 and in Karlsborg from 1998 to 2003. The college was a major contributor of engineers and researchers in partnership with the aerospace industry, major airliners and other universities.

History
Scandinavian Academy of Aeronautics was founded and opened by Runo Ewe-Ericson and Percival Ewe-Ericson in 1973 with its main campus situated in Bellmannsgatan 10, Gothenburg. For a short period in the mid 1990s its campus location was in Vestre Hamngatan,  Gothenburg, before it moved to Karlsborg in 1998 until 2003. The number of  students was radically reduced when the school moved to Karlsborg, and as co-founder and acting principal Percival Ewe-Ericson passed away in 2002 the school was closed down the following year. The shutdown led to the school filing a subpoena against the city of Karlsborg claiming they did not receive the funds promised for the establishing of the new campus.

In 2003 Lillian Syrene Ewe-Ericson founded an entity in cooperation with the Gothenburg Aviation Museum to preserve the cultural heritage the school has contributed to Sweden's aeronautical history.

Courses
Scandinavian Academy of Aeronautics offered a range of courses focused on aerospace engineering and avionics including:

Aeronautics
Combustion engine technologies
Jet engine Construction
Helicopter mechanics
Water Engines and Pumps
Machine theory
Avionics
Electronics
General Chemistry
Combustion chemistry
Thermodynamics
Computer Science
Solid mechanics
Materials science
Production Technologies
Mathematics
Physics
Technical English
Technical drawing
Business Economics
Work Psychology and Management
Ecology and Environmental Care

Accreditations
Accredited for financial support to students from the Swedish government.
Accredited for financial support to students from the Norwegian government. 
Consultative body for Swedish government on qualified higher vocational education
Accredited for financial support to students from Adlerbretska Premiestiftelsen

Admissions
General admission requirements; senior high school graduate or equivalent.

Principals
Runo Ewe-Ericson
Percival Ewe-Ericson

References 

Schools in Sweden